The PNS Karsaz is the naval station and the largest technical training facility located in the urban neighborhood of Karsaz in Karachi that provides technical education on the subjects of the mechanics and the electronics for the Navy's enlisted personnel upon their passing out from the PNS Himalaya— the Navy's only basic training boot camp in Manora Island in Karachi coast, Sindh in Pakistan.

The PNS Karsaz serves to its purpose of conducting the instructional basis vocational education that ranges from the basic–to-mid–to–advance level professional courses on mechanics and military electronics for its Operations Branch. Established with the assistance from the U.S. Navy in 1954, the PNS Karsaz is a well established and a large complex of covering the  that consists of a single administration building and four vocation schools including the auditorium, library on military history, and dormitory that houses its personnel.

Training on military electronics and mechanics does not restrict to the Navy's enlisted personnel but enlisted personnel from Marines, Army, and Air Force have been educated, certified, and earned their badges of qualifications from the PNS Karsaz.

Besides providing career training to the Pakistani military's enlisted personnel on mechanics and electronics, the PNS Karsaz has provided crucial training to the friendly nations and enlisted members from the navies of, Jordan, Maldives, Oman, Saudi Arabia, and Sri Lanka.

History 

After the partition of India that established the independence of Pakistan from the United Kingdom, the Royal Indian Navy (RIN) was divided between the navies of India and Pakistan, with Pakistan only receiving the one-third of the personnel from the Royal Indian Navy. 

At the time of the commencement of the Navy, there was no training establishment or a naval station that would ensure the training and education of the new prospective trainee to oversee the functionality of the war machinery in the Navy as India had objected transferring of all the machinery and training establishments that happens to be on Indian soil to Pakistan. There were two schools on technical educations were established— Navy Polytechnic Institute in 1951 and the PNS Karsaz in 1954.

Establishment of the PNS Karsaz lies with the contribution and the crucial assistance from the United States Navy on 24 September 1954 with Rear-Admiral Zahid Hasnain becoming its first commandant.  From 1950s until the late 1960s, the U.S. Navy officers served in the faculty of the PNS Karsaz, with initial courses offered in mechanics and machinery in 1954 and later adding instructions on electronics in 1955 with an NBCD (nuclear, biological, chemical, damage control) School being established for this purpose.

For meeting the technical training needs in mechanical machinery and electronics, the PNS Karsaz has multidimensional responsibilities by providing education and instructions on machinery maintenance and electrical and circuitry systems in the machines.

Status and use 

The cardinal aim is to impart professional, academic and practical training to Officers, CPOs, POs and Sailors of Operations, Marine Engineering, Aero technicians, Medical and Logistic branches of Pakistan Navy and similar trades of friendly countries. PNS Karsaz is committed to produce trained Technical Sailors who fulfill the requirements of Fleet/Naval Headquarters.

Schooling and training infrastructure

Schools and workshops

The establishment has classrooms fitted with modern audio/visual devices including multimedia and computers. Four schools, namely: Marine Engineering, Weapon Engineering, NBCD and Physical Training School, conduct professional training in the respective disciplines. Each school is headed by Training Commander/Officer In Charge assisted by respective faculties. The schools update and carry out training needs analysis continuously as per the requirement of Fleet. The faculties of respective schools also arrange visits, seminars and guest speakers as part of the curriculum, and endeavor to acquire latest information and developments on respective subjects.

Weapon Engineering School 

Weapon Engineering School is mandated to impart training on operations and maintenance of shipborne communication equipment, sensors and combat systems.  Modern warfare is based on fully integrated weapon suites comprising weapons, sensors and Command and Control systems; thereby dictating a need to have a competent and well trained manpower.  Accordingly, WE School aims at technical and professional grooming of Pakistan Navy’s CPOs/Sailors; ensuring effective combat readiness.  The labs available at the School are equipped with trainers and simulators to provide hands on training to PN personnel.

Marine Engineering School 

The Marine Engineering School imparts training to operate and maintain the main and auxiliary machinery fitted onboard Naval Ships. It is the only mechanical cum electrical training institute for CPOs/Sailors that impart training on maintenance and upkeep of all mechanical/electrical machinery and hull fittings fitted onboard PN ships, submarines and shore units.

NBCD School 

The NBCD School trains service personnel from PN and Foreign Navies in the discipline of Ship Damage Control and Fire fighting, NBC Warfare and First Aid. The school also imparts training to personnel associated with Merchant Navy, BOC and PARCO TOTAL.

Physical Training School 

The Physical Training School is responsible for the training of Chief Petty Officers (CPOs)/Sailors of Physical Training Branch, so that they attain the professional competence to perform the duties of Physical Instructors.

Foreign trainees 

PNS Karsaz being fully equipped with modern workshops and professionally qualified instructors, has the capability to undertake the training of personnel from friendly countries. Trainees from Oman, Jordan, Saudi Arabia, Maldives, Sri Lanka, Nigeria, Turkmenistan, and Bangladesh normally undergo training in various disciplines.

Laboratories and workshops 

The Marine Engineering School has 8 laboratories and workshops. Olympus and Tyne gas turbine trainers including newly developed simulator for SCC, Type-21 ship are the most valuable addition to the existing training aids. Machine shop has facilities for turning, milling, metal forming, grinding, shaping and cutting.

Weapon Engineering School has 21 laboratories/workshops to give practical experience on simulators, which are used by trainees to enhance fault diagnosis and trouble-shooting skills.  These labs provide an opportunity to supplement theoretical concepts with the help of practical demonstrations and experiments.  In order to ensure currency of training, the facilities & infrastructure are continually upgraded in line with latest technical developments.

In NBCD School, the advance Damage Repair Training Simulator (DRTS) is under construction which will provide a realistic damage control environment to the trainees. The school conducts fire fighting exercises using a modern fire fighting mockup. For realistic demonstration of ship stability, various models are available in the school. First Aid Training is also part of the school's curriculum. A latest CPR Training simulator is also available at the school.

Extracurricular activities 

The extracurricular activities include sports, hobbies club, dramatic club, declamation contests and quiz competitions.

Information technology 

There are more than 120 PC workstations in four different computer labs. "Net Café" has also been set up to facilitate the trainees and staff. In addition, a state of the art, internal local area network along with servers is in place to augment the training setup.

Computer-based training (CBT) 

PNS Karsaz has adopted contemporary training methodology in the form of a blended approach that entails computer-based as well as conventional learning methods. The CBT classroom environment provides simplified explanation of difficult theoretical concepts through 2D/3D graphical/animated content.

Projects 

“Design and Make” Projects are allocated to groups of trainees to enhance their innovative technical skills. Most of the projects relate to the actual engineering problems and enhancement of skills required for problem diagnosis and solutions.

Training / education / courses offered 

PNS Karsaz schools are imparting Basic, Mid Career and Advance level of Professional Training/Education to the trainees of entire Pakistan Navy.

End note 

PNS Karsaz is an all encompassing facility for technical training up to Diploma level. Labs and well equipped workshops provide ample opportunity for hands on training and clarity of concepts. Physical and sports facilities accommodate the physical and mental health of the trainees. All these facilities grouped together.

See also 
 Pakistan Navy

References 

Karsaz
Karsaz
Military installations in Karachi